Carl J. Gatto (December 29, 1937April 10, 2012) was a Republican member of the Alaska House of Representatives, representing the 13th District since 2002. He served as Chair of the Military & Veterans' Affairs Special Committee, and was a member of the Judiciary Committee, State Affairs Committee, Administrative Regulation Review Committee and the Legislative Council. He also served on the Military & Veterans' Affairs, Natural Resources and the Revenue Finance Subcommittees, for the 26th Legislature. Before public office Carl Gatto was a paramedic and fire officer for the Anchorage Fire Department.



Personal life
Representative Gatto was married to Cathy and had four children: Kip, Antonia, Samantha and Gabriel. He attended the Brooklyn Technical High School in Brooklyn, New York, received his Bachelor of Science in Mechanical Engineering from the Brooklyn Polytechnic, Brooklyn, New York, received his Bachelor of Arts in Physical Science & Biology as well as his Teacher Certification in High School and Special Education, from the California State University, San Jose, received his Master of Science in Biology from the Northern Arizona University, and also received his A.A. Paramedicine and Fire Instructor I, II, III certification from the University of Alaska, Anchorage.

References

External links
 Alaska State House Majority Site
 Project Vote Smart profile
 Carl Gatto at 100 Years of Alaska's Legislature

1937 births
2012 deaths
San Jose State University alumni
Deaths from cancer in Washington (state)
Republican Party members of the Alaska House of Representatives
Northern Arizona University alumni
People from Palmer, Alaska
University of Alaska Anchorage alumni
Deaths from prostate cancer
Politicians from New York City
Polytechnic Institute of New York University alumni
Brooklyn Technical High School alumni
21st-century American politicians